The Stone Mountain Scenic Railroad (SMRR) is a standard gauge railroad that circles the perimeter of Stone Mountain Park in a loop, and provides views of the mountain en route.

History
The railroad utilizes what was originally an industrial spur built in 1869 by the Stone Mountain Granite Company to serve quarries at the foot of the Stone Mountain, with a connection to the Georgia Railroad's main line in Stone Mountain Village. The railroad later started an excursion service to the mountain. The spur was later abandoned, leaving the right of way in place (with the rails removed). In 1960, Stone Mountain Scenic Railroad, Inc. was formed to construct a tourist railroad encircling the mountain, operating it under lease from the Stone Mountain Memorial Association (a state-operated association established in 1958 for developing and managing the mountain as a park). Between 1961 and 1963, two miles of former quarry trackage were rebuilt, followed by construction of additional new trackage to complete the road around the perimeter of the mountain.

The Stone Mountain Memorial Association assumed full operation of the railroad in 1981.  As the steam locomotives came in need of major repairs, the road opted to withdraw them and operate diesels.  In 1987, the spur connecting the mountain trackage to the CSX main line was restored, and the railroad hosted several visiting trains, including Savannah and Atlanta Railway steam locomotive number 750.  With the connection, the railroad became subject to FRA regulations, in which case the road, just as the railroad to which it is connected, was required to maintain its track, infrastructure, and rolling stock to a certain degree of good repair to be permitted to operate.

In January 1998, the Memorial Association leased operations of the railroad and the other attractions within the park to Herschend Family Entertainment, operators of the Silver Dollar City theme park in Branson, Missouri and the Dollywood theme park in Pigeon Forge, Tennessee.

In 2004, the trackage connecting the railroad to the main line was dismantled and the spur truncated to just before the bridge spanning Robert E. Lee Boulevard within the park's premises.  The trackage and decking were removed, though the bridge's girders remain, and the right of way to the west of the bridge was converted to a pedestrian trail, while the railroad continues to use the remaining track to reverse the train's direction.  Contrary to the perceptions of the railfan community regarding the disconnection, the railroad remains subject to the FRA's jurisdiction and continues to maintain the equipment and trackage accordingly.  In 2011, major upgrades of the track, passenger cars, and diesel locomotives were performed.  The diesel locomotives received new motors and other upgrades, as well as a new paint scheme.  The steam locomotives received some cosmetic restoration at this time as well.  The railroad had de-accessioned its last remaining steam locomotives in early 2013, and currently owns and operates diesels exclusively.

Locomotives

Stone Mountain originally had three steam locomotives, the "General II," "Texas II," and "Yonah II."  The SMRR named the engines after the famous engines of The Great Locomotive Chase, and were given nineteenth century style smokestacks and headlights.  Despite these modifications, the engines, having been built between 1919 and 1927, still have noticeably modern appearances, with larger proportions than their ancestors and have more advanced cylinders, valve gear, and other modern applications.  While steam engines ceased running in the 1980s, they continued to "pull" trains for some time.  In these instances, one of the steam engines was coupled in front of a diesel which, while disguised as a baggage car or auxiliary tender, would push the engine.  The diesel's controls were placed in the cab of the engine and air piped from the diesel's main reservoir to allow the steam engine's whistle to sound.  Aside from the whistle, the steam locomotive remained inactive, with the diesel being the train's sole motive power.

In the late 1980s and early 90s, the railroad supplemented its GP7 and GP9 diesels with ones inherited from the recently dissolved New Georgia Railway, which have pulled trains regularly since.  At that time, the steam engines would only be pushed on special occasions, and no attempt was made to disguise the diesel behind it.  The practice of pushing the steam engines ended in 2002, and they remained within the yard until being donated to other tourist railroads or museums, the first leaving the railroad in 2008, followed by the remaining two in 2013.

The Stone Mountain Railroad currently has the following locomotives:
6143 and 6147 - Two FP7A diesel locomotives built by EMD in 1950 for Southern Railway's Cincinnati, New Orleans and Texas Pacific subsidiary.  SOU successor Norfolk Southern sold these diesels to the New Georgia Railroad, and were turned over to Stone Mountain upon the New Georgia's demise.  One of these locomotives can normally be found pulling the train on a daily basis. In 2011, both locomotives underwent a major rebuild, replacing their 1500 horsepower 567BC prime movers with the 2000 horsepower 645E model, as well as new main and auxiliary generators, new air compressors, a full 26L air brake system installed, rebuilt trucks with D87 traction motors, rewired with Dash-2 control mechanisms, air conditioned cabs, and upgraded cab layout, and power generators installed in the rear of the locomotives to supply power for the passenger cars. Originally painted in Southern Railway and Central of Georgia liveries, respectively, both engines received a new Central of Georgia inspired livery after their rebuilds.

 #5896 - A former Chesapeake and Ohio Railway GP7 diesel built by EMD in 1953.  This engine is occasionally used to pull the train, when the other diesels are not available.  At the end of 2010, 5896 was rewired, a rebuilt main generator and auxiliary generator installed, 16 all new power assemblies installed in the 567 diesel engine, a full 26L brake system installed and repainted in the railroad's new Central of Georgia inspired paint scheme.

Former equipment

The following have resided at Stone Mountain at one time, but have since moved elsewhere:
 #1910, The Dinky - Originally Johnstown Traction Company number 358 built by St. Louis Car Company in 1925 as an electric streetcar.  It was outfitted with a diesel motor when acquired by the park, eliminating the need for overhead lines.  Now at the Trolley Museum of New York, Kingston, New York.
 #51 - 25 ton diesel switcher built by General Electric for Georgia Power.  Currently operating at the ISG Resource's concrete plant in Lakeville, Minnesota.
 #42, The Mary Payne - 45 ton diesel switcher built by General Electric for the United States Marine Corps.  Current whereabouts unknown.
 #6661 - A former Chesapeake and Ohio Railway GP9 diesel built by EMD in 1956, and later transferred to the C&O subsidiary, Baltimore and Ohio Railroad, and finally, to the Atlanta, Stone Mountain and Lithonia Railway before acquisition by the Stone Mountain Railroad.  The 6661 was sold for scrap in late 2011.
 Baggage car/tender - An EMD SW1 diesel built in 1946 as Boston and Maine Railroad #1114.  Acquired by Stone Mountain in 1973 to assist the steam locomotives.  Later fitted with a false baggage car shell when the railroad began to dieselize so as to make the steam locomotive placed in front appear to be pulling the train when, in fact, the diesel was actually powering the train.  Sold in 1995 to become Standridge Color's #3 in Social Circle, GA.
 #104, The General II - a former Red River and Gulf Railroad 4-4-0 steam locomotive built by Baldwin in 1919.  Acquired from Spence's Louisiana Eastern along with number 60, both represent two of four LE steam engines still in existence.  Withdrawn 1986 due to boiler and mechanical issues, 104 was the last engine to operate under steam at the park.  The engine continued to occasionally "pull" the train while pushed by a diesel until 1991.  In 2005, the engine was placed on a plinth outside the engine shed and received a new coat of paint on the sides visible to passing trains.  The Stone Mountain Memorial Association donated the engine to the Southeastern Railway Museum in Duluth, GA in 2007, and moved to the museum the following year, where it currently resides.
 #110, The Yonah II - a former McRae Lumber & Manufacturing 2-6-2 steam locomotive built by the Vulcan Iron Works in 1927.  The engine went to the Beechwood Band Mill in Cordele, Georgia, in 1930 before being sold in 1933 to the Cliffside Railroad. The Cliffside retired the engine when the road dieselized in 1962, and sold it the following year to the Swamp Rabbit Railroad in Cleveland, South Carolina, who sold the engine to Stone Mountain in 1969.  First steam locomotive to be withdrawn from active service, having encountered running gear issues in 1982.  Placed on display at the Memorial Depot in 1984.  The Stone Mountain Memorial Association donated the engine to the New Hope Valley Railway in Bonsal, North Carolina in 2012, and the engine was moved to the railway in early February 2013.  The New Hope Valley intends to restore the engine to operating condition, which is anticipated to take five to seven years at an estimated cost of $600,000 based on an initial survey of the engine performed in 2012. The engine was given a cosmetic restoration and placed on display, while the railway continues to evaluate the engine's components and raise funds for operation.
 #60, The Texas II - a former San Antonio and Aransas Pass Railway 4-4-0 built by the Baldwin Locomotive Works in 1923.  Through merger, came into Southern Pacific Railroad subsidiary Texas and New Orleans.  Paulsen Spence bought the engine for his proposed Louisiana Eastern Railroad and was sold to Stone Mountain after his death.  Withdrawn in 1983 when it came in need of boiler work and other mechanical issues, though it continued to occasionally "pull" the train while pushed by a diesel until 2002, and remained within the rail yard thereafter.  In 2011, the engine received a partial cosmetic restoration, including the removal of the undergrowth and repainting the portions of the engine that are visible to passing trains, similar to what was previously done to the General II.  The Stone Mountain Memorial Association donated the engine to the Gulf and Ohio Railways in Knoxville, Tennessee in 2012.  The engine was moved to Tennessee in March, 2013 and is undergoing restoration to operating condition for use on the Gulf and Ohio's Three Rivers Rambler tourist train operation.
 #3525, The Big Dixie - a former Illinois Central Railroad 0-8-0 steam locomotive built by Baldwin in 1922.  Acquired by Stone Mountain in 1967, sold shortly thereafter when its size and short wheelbase proved to be too heavy for the railroad's sixty pound rails at the time.  Currently at Tanglewood Park in Clemmons, NC.
 #349 - a former Central of Georgia Railway 4-4-0 built by the Baldwin Locomotive Works in 1891.  Engine was originally considered for the railroad's General II, but passed in favor of Red River and Gulf Railroad #104 as the latter was in better condition.  Sold to Tennessee Valley Railroad Museum, from which currently on loan to Children's Hospital at Erlanger.

See also

Dollywood Express
Frisco Silver Dollar Line

References

External links
The General II at Steam Locomotive.info
Friends of the SA&AP 60 - San Antonio Railroad Heritage Museum's page on the Texas II
 Photos of the General's move
Historic locomotive to move to Southeastern Railway Museum
Our Georgia History

Transportation in DeKalb County, Georgia
Heritage railroads in Georgia (U.S. state)
Tourist attractions in DeKalb County, Georgia
Stone Mountain